Patrick John Myers Egan is an American baseball coach and former pitcher, who is the current head baseball coach of the Sacred Heart Pioneers. He played college baseball at Quinnipiac from 2003 to 2007. He played professionally from 2007 to 2013.

Playing career
Egan attended Rocky Hill High School where he played basketball and pitched on the baseball teams. He was a first-team All-Connecticut selection in his senior season for basketball. He would accept a basketball scholarship to join the Quinnipiac Bobcats men's basketball team in the fall of 2002, while attempting to walk-on to the Bobcats' baseball team as well.

As a freshman on the Quinnipiac basketball team, he appeared in every game averaging 4.5 points per game, 2.6 rebounds per game.

Coaching career
On August 10, 2022, Egan was named the head baseball coach of the Sacred Heart Pioneers.

Head coaching record

References

External links
Sacred Heart bio

Living people
1984 births
Aberdeen IronBirds players
Bluefield Orioles players
Bowie Baysox players
Delmarva Shorebirds players
Frederick Keys players
Gwinnett Braves players
Mississippi Braves players
Norfolk Tides players
Sacred Heart Pioneers baseball coaches
Quinnipiac Bobcats baseball coaches
Quinnipiac Bobcats baseball players
Quinnipiac Bobcats men's basketball players